John Denver and the Muppets: A Christmas Together is a 1979 Christmas television special starring Jim Henson's Muppets and singer-songwriter John Denver. The special first aired December 5, 1979, on ABC. It has never been released on any standard home video format but the special is available for viewing at the Paley Center for Media, alongside other Muppet specials.

Plot
The special opens with Denver and the Muppets singing "The Twelve Days of Christmas". To add comedic effect, Fozzie Bear forgets his line ("Seven swans a-swimming.") and Miss Piggy overemphasizes hers ("Five gold rings, ba-dum, bum, bum.")

The main plot of the rest of the special is the creation of the special itself and a special musical number for Miss Piggy. During the discussion of her number, Miss Piggy confronts Denver in her dressing room about their presumably mutual attraction. Miss Piggy, as a doll named Fifi, sings "I Will Wait for You" to Denver, who plays a wooden soldier trying to stay in step with a line of marching wooden soldiers.

The program concludes with Denver reciting the story of Jesus' birth and joining the Muppets to sing "Stille Nacht/Silent Night" while the children in the audience join in.

Cast

 John Denver as himself

Muppet performers
 Jim Henson as Kermit the Frog, Rowlf the Dog, Dr. Teeth, The Swedish Chef, Waldorf, and Link Hogthrob
 Frank Oz as Miss Piggy, Fozzie Bear, and Animal
 Jerry Nelson as Robin the Frog, Sgt. Floyd Pepper, and Lew Zealand
 Richard Hunt as Scooter, Janice, Statler, and Beaker
 Dave Goelz as Gonzo the Great, Dr. Bunsen Honeydew, and Zoot

Soundtrack album

The soundtrack album of the same name has 13 tracks of traditional Christmas carols and original songs. This album, originally released on RCA Records in October 1979, was re-released on CD by Denver's own Windstar label in 1990 and again by LaserLight Digital in 1998; LaserLight issued it once again in 2001, this time as an abridged 10-track version; the original full-length CD was subsequently reissued in its entirety in 2006 (the previously missing tracks are "Have Yourself a Merry Little Christmas", "When the River Meets the Sea", and "Little Saint Nick"). All releases of the album contain a different recording of "The Twelve Days of Christmas" than that featured in the TV special, along with their rendition of "Christmas Is Coming".

"Have Yourself a Merry Little Christmas", "We Wish You a Merry Christmas", and "A Baby Just Like You" was released as a red vinyl 45 rpm single (RCA PB-11767), while "The Peace Carol", "We Wish You a Merry Christmas", and "Deck the Halls" were issued on a radio-only promo single (RCA PB-9463).

A sheet music edition contains most of the songs and the musical scores.

Track listing

Notes
  signifies arranged by
  Mike Love was added to the credits for "Little Saint Nick" after a 1994 court case.

Personnel
The following credits are sourced from liner notes included with the album release:
 John Denver – lead and harmony vocals, acoustic guitar, 12-string guitar, arranger

Muppet performers
 Dave Goelz – lead and harmony vocals
 Louise Gold – harmony vocals
 Jim Henson – lead and harmony vocals
 Richard Hunt – lead and harmony vocals
 Kathryn Mullen – harmony vocals
 Jerry Nelson – lead and harmony vocals
 Frank Oz – lead and harmony vocals
 Steve Whitmire – harmony vocals

Session musicians
 Hal Blaine – drums, percussion, arranger
 Denny Brooks – acoustic guitar, arranger
 James Burton – acoustic guitar, electric guitar, dobro, arranger
 Ray Charles – vocal arranger
 Emory Gordy Jr. – bass guitar, arranger
 Glen D. Hardin – piano, electric piano, electric organ, celesta, arranger
 Lee Holdridge – orchestra arranger
 Jim Horn – flute, tin whistle, alto flute, bass flute, baritone saxophone, arranger
 Herb Pedersen – acoustic guitar, electric guitar, banjo, arranger
 Danny Wheetman – mandolin, harmonica, arranger

See also
 List of Christmas films

References

External links
 

1979 television specials
1970s American television specials
The Muppets television specials
American Broadcasting Company television specials
Christmas television specials
1979 soundtrack albums
1979 Christmas albums
John Denver albums
The Muppets albums
Christmas albums by American artists
Pop Christmas albums
RCA Records soundtracks
RCA Records Christmas albums
Albums arranged by Lee Holdridge
Albums produced by Milt Okun
American Christmas television specials